The Carter–Jones House is a historic house locatedt in Yellville, Arkansas.

Description and history 
It is a two-story structure, built of logs and wood framing, and finished in clapboards. Its appearance is largely the result of major alterations made in 1901 to what was probably a dog trot log structure built in 1847. The only visible elements of the older structure are to be found in the basement of the building, which otherwise appears to be a stylish turn-of-the-century Queen Anne Victorian. The 1901 expansion was made by Perry Carter, a prominent local businessman and politician, and the house was also home to his son-in-law, W. R. Jones, publisher of the Mountain Echo, the local newspaper.

The house was listed on the National Register of Historic Places on July 21, 1987.

See also
National Register of Historic Places listings in Marion County, Arkansas

References

Houses on the National Register of Historic Places in Arkansas
Houses completed in 1901
Houses in Marion County, Arkansas
National Register of Historic Places in Marion County, Arkansas
Queen Anne architecture in Arkansas
1901 establishments in Arkansas
Yellville, Arkansas